The Katagans are a medieval Mongol tribe related to Genghis Khan. In the period of Mongol conquest and assimilation with enslaved by Turkic tribes played its role in the ethnogenesis of modern Kazakhs, Kyrgyz, Karakalpaks, Uzbeks, Buryats, Uyghurs and others.

Origins

The Katagan (Hatagin) Mongol tribe is said to originate from Buha-Hatagi – the eldest son of Mongol mother Alan Gua. The Katagan tribe came to Transoxania together with the son of Genghis Khan, Chagatay, and played a significant role in the political history and ethnogenesis of many modern Turkic peoples.

The Katagans are referred to in the works of Rashid ad Din, namely in his historical ethnographic work Jami' al-tawarikh written in the early 14th century.

According to The Secret History of the Mongols, the origin of Katagans is the following: 
Borte-Chino, born by the order of the Higher Heaver. His wife was Gia-Maral and they descent being Bata-Chigan.
The son of Bata-Chigan – Timacha
The son of Timacha – Horichar-Mergan
The son of Horichar-Mergan – Auchjam-Boroul
The son Auchjam-Boroula – Sali-Hachau
The son of Sali -Hachau – Eke-Nidun
The son of Eke-Nidun – Sim-Sochi
The son of Sim-Sochi – Harchu
The son of Harchu – Bordjigadai-Mergan was married to Mongolchin-goa
The son of Mongolchin-goa – Torolchin-Bayan was married to Borohchin-goa
The son of Torolchin: Duva-Sohor and Dobun-Mergan
Dobun-Mergan married Alan-goa, the son Hori-Tumat Horilartay-Mergan, born in Arih-usune. They had two sons: Bugunotai and Belguntonai
After the death of Dobun-Mergana, widowed Alan-goa bore three sons from Maalih Bayaudaisa: Bugu-Hadagi, Buhatu-Salchi and Bodonchar-Prostak.
Belguntai became the forefather of the Belgunot tribe
Bugunotai became the forefather of the Bugunot tribe
Bugu-Hatagi became the forefather of the Katagans
Buhutu-Salchi became the forefather of the Salchuyit tribe
Bodonchar became the forefather of the Borchigin generation – the origin of Genghis Khan

Katagans as part of the Uzbeks
Some sources speak of the Katagans as being part of the Uzbek tribes in the mid-16th century. The Katagans are mentioned in the lists of 92 Uzbek tribes.

Muhammad Yar Arab Katagan, a famous descendant of the Uzbek Katagan tribe, was a 16th-century historian and the author of Musahhir al-bilad ('The conquest of lands') in Persian on the history of the Shaybanids. 
Uzbek Katagans used to live in the territories of Horzem, Tashkent, Surhandaryinsk, and Kashkadayin regions and in the Fergana Region of Uzbekistan. The Katagans used to live in the territories of Tajikistan and Afghanistan as well. According to the 2010 census in Tajikistan, there were 7601 Katagans living there.
According to historical data, in the 1640s, the Katagans were one of the strong tribes living in Balha and partly in Kunduz, Afghanistan. During the Ashtarhanid era, the Balha region was given to the Katagans as a nomad camp. At the same time, the Katagans formed a strong political alliance. In the beginning of the 17th century during the reign of Muhmudbyi, Balh and Badakhshan became known as the land of the Katagans.

In the 19th century, numerous Uzbek Katagans lived in Kunduz, Afghanistan. 
Katagans in Kunduz and Tash-kurgan were considered to be the descendants of 16 sons, each of whom was descended from separate clans. Five sons were from one mother – the Besh Bola group. The other 11 sons were from a different mother – the Chegun group. Besh Bola was divided into the following clans: Kesamir, Djung, Katagan, Luhan, Tas, Munas. The Munas were divided into Chuchugar, Chechka, Yugul, Sirug, Temuz, Burka, Berdja. The Chegun consisted of Murad, Basuz, Ssiri Katagan, Churag, Djuduba, Katagan Kurasi, Murad Shaih, Adjigun, Kin, Kudagun, and Semiz.

The Uzbek Katagans of southern Uzbekistan speak the Kipchak and Karluk-Chigil dialects of the Uzbek language, which is evidenced by ethnolinguistic research.
The Tohchi Katagans that used to live in the Surhan-Sherabad oasis speak the Karluk-Chigil dialect of with "yi" later, such as Turks and Karluks.

Katagans as part of the Kazakhs
According to Mukhamedzhan Tynyshpaev, the Katagans made Tursun khan, the ruler of Tashkent, the major power of Kazakh Khan, who was defeated in war in 1628 by another Kazakh Khan Esim. Afterwards, the numerous and powerful Katagan tribe split into several: one part which kept the title Shanshykyly became part of the Kazakhs Elder Zhuz; other parts of Katagan became part of the Uzbeks, Karakalpaks and Kyrgyzs.

According to Abu-k-Gazi-bahadur-khan in "Shadjara-yi va mogul", the Kazakh Katagans were destroyed in 1628 with the assassination of khan Tursun-Muhammed. The ease of their destruction is explained by the fact that most of the tribe left for Kashgariya at the end of the 16th century, the time of Yarkend Abd ak-Karim khan's rule. They thus became few in number and very vulnerable. The Katagans who migrated to Kashgariya were headed by Sultan Gazi-sultan, who was given the Kargarlyk land by the khan of Yardkend. His descendants held state positions later on, and the Katagans assimilated with the local Uyghurs.

From Tynyshpaev's work "Kyrgyz-kazakhs of XVII and XVIII centuries" (addition to materials about the history of the Kyrgyz-Kazakh people):

In 1627, the historian Abulgazy Bogadurkhan fled Khiva from his brother Asfendiar and was received by Yesim, who lived in the mountains of Turkestan. Three months later, another Kazakh khan, Tursun, who owned Tashkent, arrived. Yesum handed an honorary refugee over to Tursun, with whom Abulgazy moved to Tashkent. Further, Abulgazy reports that two years later Yesim attacked Tursun and "killed him and killed the Katagans".

Traditions that have survived among the clan of the Chanshchk in the Tashkent district state that their khan was once Tursun, who was killed by Yesim. After that, most of the Katagans fled to Bukhara, and the remaining ones began to be named after the branch of the Chanshkl Katagans.

Chokan Valikhanov, speaking about the Elder Zhuz of Kazakh, notes:

Katagans are the most ancient people living in the south of Central Asia and Kazakhstan. At the beginning of the 17th century. they formed the main support force of the ruler of Tashkent – Tursun-khan, and in the middle of the 17th century, part of them became part of the Uzbek people, and the other part was part of the Kazakh Chaniishki tribe.

References

Sources
Rashididdin. Collection of annals. M .; L., 1952. T. 1-2. Book. 1-2.
Abu-l Ghazi Bahadurhan. Shazharayi Turk. Tashkent, 1992.
Burkhaniddin Khan of Kushkek. Kattagan and Badakhshan / translated from Persian. Tashkent, 1926.
Grebenkin AD Uzbeks: Collected Works, Vol. "Russian Turkestan". Issue. 2. Tashkent, 1872.
Materials on the regionalization of Central Asia. Book. 1, 2. The territory and population of Bukhara and Khorezm. Part 1. Bukhara. Part 2. Khorezm. Tashkent, 1926.
Karmysheva B. Kh. Essays on the ethnic history of the southern regions of Tajikistan and Uzbekistan. M., 1976.
Valikhanov Ch. Legends and tales of the Great Kirghiz-Kaisatsky Horde: Alma-Ata, 1961. Vol. 1.
Aristov N.A. Experience of elucidating the ethnic composition of the Kirghiz Cossacks of the great Horde // Living Antiquity. Issue. 3, 4. 1894. P. 405.
Ghazi Alim. Katagans from the Uzbek tribes and their language // Ilmiy Fikr. 1930. № 1.
Tynyshpaev M. Materials on the history of the Kirghiz-Kazakh people. Tashkent, 1925

Central Asian people
Mongols
Nirun Mongols